Fidesco may refer to:
 Fidesco Group - company
 Fidesco International - Catholic organization